Béla Nagy (born 27 July 1943) is a Hungarian archer. He competed at the 1972 Summer Olympics and the 1980 Summer Olympics.

References

1943 births
Living people
Hungarian male archers
Olympic archers of Hungary
Archers at the 1972 Summer Olympics
Archers at the 1980 Summer Olympics
Sportspeople from Budapest